"Girl of My Dreams" is a song by Canadian pop rock band The Moffatts. It was released in January 1999 as the third single from their third album, Chapter I: A New Beginning. The song was a hit in Canada, reaching number 19 on Canada's singles chart and peaked at number 4 on the Canadian RPM Adult Contemporary chart.  It is unrelated to the 1979 song of the same name by British band Bram Tchaikovsky.

Music video
The music video premiered in early 1999. There are two music videos were released for the song: One was a live footage from one of their concerts, and one official version shot in U.K.

Track listing

Chart positions

References

1999 singles
The Moffatts songs
EMI Records singles
1999 songs